The following is a list of some prominent mango cultivars. Worldwide, hundreds of mango cultivars are known, with over 1000 varieties in India.

Most commercial cultivars belong to Mangifera indica, while a few commercial varieties grown in Southeast Asia belong to other Mangifera species. Southeast Asia, Australia, the United States and some African countries cultivate locally selected varieties, while most other countries grow cultivars developed in Florida.

Table of mangoes 
Reportedly, in India alone, there are around 283 types of mangoes, out of which only 30 are well-known.
The United States Department of Agriculture (USDA) facility on Old Cutler Road in Coral Gables, Florida, has about 400 varieties of mangoes and is one of the largest depositories of mango plant cultures in the world. The USDA collection was originally believed to have over 500 varieties of mango germplasm, but genetic testing showed several duplicates. In the United States, South Florida is one of the meccas for mangoes due to year-round temperate climate and culture fascinated by mangoes and several nurseries dedicated to bringing new varieties of mangoes into the US by either import or selective breeding.  Reviews of older varieties of mangoes were based upon the competition available at the time. Most of the varieties of mangoes available in grocery stores in the United States can trace their lineage to the Haden mango tree, a tree planted by Jack Haden in 1902 in Coral Gables, Florida (Haden itself can be traced back to Malgova which is misspelled Malgoba in US and has its origin in Tamil Nadu, India). The Zills family has created a number of new varieties of mango, most recently, Gary Zill with Zill's High Performance a selective breeding program of new varieties. The following are among the more widely grown mango cultivars, listed by the country in which they were selected or are most extensively cultivated:

List of cultivars by nation

Asia
Bangladesh: Amrapali, Haribhanga, Himsagar, BARI-4, Langra, Chokanan, BARI-11, Mahachanok, Gaurmati, BARI-13, Mallika, Sindoori
Cambodia: Cambodiana
China: Baiyu, Guixiang, Huangpi, Huangyu, Macheco, Sannian, Yuexi
India: priyoor mango Alphonso, Amrapali, Alampur Baneshan, Badshahpasand, Bangalora, Banganapalle, Black and Rose, Bombay, Bombay Green, Badami, Chausa, Cheruku Rasalu, Chinna rasalu, Chitoor, Rumani, Maharaja Pasand, Chinnarasam, Unda manfa, Dasheri, Dudhiya Malda, Ela Manga, Gaddamar, Gadam Mary, Fajri Kalan, Fernandian, HusanNara, Gulabkhas, Himayath, Himsagar, Imam Pasand, Imam Hussain Mango, Jehangir, Surkha, Kalepad, Kishen Bhog, Komanga, Kothapalli Kobbari, Kuttiyattor, Kalami, Gir Kesar, Lalbaug, Langra Benarsi,Maldah, Malgis, Malgoa, Mankur (Goa), Mallika, Mankurad, Mercury, Moovandan, Nagulapalli Rasalu, Nasik Pasand, Nattuma, Nannari, Neelum, Neeleshan, Ottu Mangai, Panchadara Kalasa, Panduri Mamidi, Payri, Pedda Rasalu, Priyor, Puliyan, Rani, Rajapuri, Raspuri, Ratna, Rayal Special, Safeda, Sammar Bahisht, Suvarnarekha, Thalimango, Totapuri, Vanraj, Yahya Mariam Mango, Zardalu, Nuzividu Rasalu.
Indonesia: Arumanis/Harumanis, Gadung/Gedong, Manalagi, Mangga Madu, Cengkir/Indramayu, Gajah, Bapang, Lalijiwo, Kueni, Golek, Kemiri, Boled, Bengkulu, Situbondo, Kelapa, Alor, Selaputih, Kedundang 
Republic of Korea (Jeju Island, Jeollanam-do, Chungcheongnam-do, Gyeongsangnam-do, Gyeonggi-do): Apple mango, Irwin, Zillate
Japan (Okinawa): Irwin
Malaysia: Apple Mango, Apple Rumani, Arumanis, Golek, Kuala Selangor, Malgoa, Maha-65, Tok Boon
Myanmar: Aung Din (အောင်ဒင်), Ma Chit Su (မချစ်စု), Po Pyu Kalay, Sein Ta Lone (စိန်တစ်လုံး), Shwe Hin Tha (ရွှေဟင်္သာ)
Nepal: Alphonso, Amrapali, Dusehri, Bombay, Mallika, Pharsi aamp, Supadi aamp, Sindure aamp and other local cultivars.
Pakistan: Almaas, Alphonso, Anmol, Anwar Rataul, BaganPali, Chaunsa, Chok Anan, Collector, Dusehri, Desi Ada Pamato, Desi Badam,  Desi Gola, Desi Badshah, Dilkash, Fajri, Gulab Janhu, Gulab Khas, Lahoti, Lal Badshah, Langra, Malda, Muhammad Wole, Nawab Puri, Neelum, Rani Phool, Sindhri, Saroli, Sawarnarika, Saleh Bhai, Saib, Shan-e-Khuda, Taimuria, Toofan, Wanghi, Zafran
Philippines: Apple mango, Carabao (Kinalabaw), Kabayo (Cabayo), Katchamitha ("Indian"), Pico (Padero), Paho, Pahohutan
Singapore: Apple Mango, Arumanis, Golek, Kaem Yao, Mangga Dadol
Sri Lanka: Dampara, Hingurakgoda, Karutha Kolomban, Malwana[under-ground] amba, Parrot Mango and Peterpasand, Petti amba, Rata amba, Vellai Kolomban, Wild Mango, Willard, Mee Amba, Kohu Amba, Pol Amba, Giraa amba, Red Willard, Green Willard, Mallika, TJC Mango.
Taiwan: JinHwang, Red JinHwang, TaiNong No. 1, Irwin
Thailand: Selected Mango varieties in Thai alphabet order. 
ก: แก้ว 007 Kaeo 007, กระแตลืมรัง Kratae Luemrang, กระสวย Krasuay, กล้วย Kluay, กะล่อนทอง Kalonthong, การะเกด Karaket, กาละแม Kalamae, กำปั่น Kampan, แก้มแดง Kaemdaeng, แก้วขาว Kaeo Khao, แก้วเขียว Kaeo Khieo, แก้วทวาย Kaeo Tawai, แก้วลืมคอน Kaeo Luemkon, แก้วลืมรัง Kaeo Luemrang, แก้วสามปี Kaeo Sampi, แก้วหอม Kaeo Hom.
ข: ขอช้าง Khochang, ขายตึก Khaituek, ขี้ใต้ Khitai, ขี้ทุบ Khithup, ขุนทิพย์ Khunthip, เขียวไข่กา Khiaokhaika, เขียวภูเก็ต Khiaopuket, เขียวเสวย Khiaosawoey, เขียวเสวยรจนา Khiaosawoey Rotchana, ไขตึก Khaituek.
ค: คล้ายเขียวเสวย Khlay Khiaosawoey, คอนกแก้ว Khonokkaeo, ค้างคาวลืมรัง Khangkao Luemrang, คำ Kham, คุ Ku.
ง: งาขาวหรืองาหม่นยาว Nga Khaomonyao, งาเขียว Nga Khiao, งาช้าง Nga Chang, งาดาบ Nga Dap, งาแดง Nga Daeng, งาท้องเรือ Nga Thongruae, งาหม่น Nga Mon, เงาะ Ngo.
จ: จันทร์เจ้าขา Chanchaokha, จำปา Champa, เจ้าคุณทิพย์ Chaokhunthip, เจ้าพระยา Chaopraya, เจ้าเสวย Chaosawoey.
ช: ช้างตกตึก Changtoktuek, โชคโสภณ Chok Sopon, โชคอนันต์ Chok Anan, โชคอนันต์ก้านชมพู Chok Anankanchompu.
ต: ตลับนาค Talapnak, ตะเพียนทอง Tapianthong, ตับเป็ด Tuppet, ตาเตะหลาน Ta Te-Lan, แตงกวา Thaeng Kwao.
ท: ทวายเดือนเก้า Thawai Dueankao, ทองขาว Thongkhao, ทองขาวกลม Thongkhaoklom, ทองขาวยาว Thongkhaoyao, ทองเจ้าพัฒน์ Thongchaopat, ทองดำ Thongdam, ทองดำกลายพันธุ์ Thongdam Klaipan, ทองดำมีร่อง Thongdam Mirong, ทองแดง Thongdaeng, ทองทวาย Thongthawai, ทองประกายแสด Thongprakaisat, ทองปลายแขน Thongplaikhean, ทองไม่รู้วาย Thongmairuwai, ทุเรียน Thurian, ทูลถวาย Thunthawai, เทพนิมิตร Thepnimit, เทพรส Thepparot.
น: นวลจันทร์ Nuanchan, นวลแตง Nuanthaeng, นาทับ Nathap, น้ำดอกไม้ Nam Doc Mai, น้ำดอกไม้ทวาย Namdokmai Thawai, น้ำดอกไม้เบอร์ 4 Namdokmai No.4, น้ำดอกไม้เบอร์ 5 Namdokmai No.5, น้ำดอกไม้พระประแดง Namdokmai Phrapradaeng, น้ำดอกไม้สีทอง Namdokmai Sithong, น้ำดอกไม้สุพรรณ Namdokmai Suphan, น้ำตาลจีน Namtan Chin, น้ำตาลเตา Namtan Tao, น้ำตาลปากกระบอก Namtan Pakkrabok, น้ำตาลทรายหนัก Namtansainak, น้ำผึ้ง Nampueng.
บ: บานเย็น Banyen, บุญบันดาล Bunbandan, เบา Bao.
ผ: ผ้าขี้ริ้วห่อทอง Pakhirio Hothong.
พ: พญาลืมเฝ้า Payaluemfao, พญาเสวย Payasawoey, พรวนขอ Phruankho, พราหมณ์ก้นขอ Phram Konkho, พราหมณ์เนื้อแดง Phram Nueadaeng, พราหมณ์เนื้อเหลือง Phram Nuealueang, พัดน้ำผึ้ง Phatnampueng, พิมเสนกลายพันธุ์ Phimsen Klaipan, พิมเสนแดง Phimsen Daeng, พิมเสนเปรี้ยว Phimsen Preow, พิมเสนมัน Phimsen Man, เพชรบ้านลาด Phetbanlat.
ฟ: ฟ้าลั่น Falan, ฟ้าแอปเปิล Fa-apple, แฟบ Faep.
ม: มนโฑ Monto, มะปราง Maprang, มะลิลา Malila, มันบางขุนศรี Manbangkhunsi, มันค่อม Mankom, มันทวาย Manthawai, มันทวายนักรบ Manthawai Nakrop, มันทองเอก Manthong Aek, มันทะลุฟ้า Manthalufa, มันบ้านลาด Manbanlat, มหาชนก Mahachanok, มันพิเศษ Manpiset, มันสะเด็ด Mansadet, มันสายฟ้า Mansaifa, มันหมู Manmu, มันหยด Manyot, มันหวาน Manwan, มันแห้ว Manhaeo, มันอยุธยา Man Ayuthaya, เมล็ดนิ่ม Maletnim, แม่ลูกดก Maelukdok, แมวเซา Maeosao.
ย: ยายกล่ำ Yaiglam.
ร: รจนา Rotchana, ระเด่นขาว Radenkhao, ระเด่นเขียว Radenkhiao, แรด Raet.
ล: ล่า La, ลิ้นงูเห่า Lin Nguhao, ลูกกลม Lukklom, ลูกแดง Lukdaeng, ลูกโยนพระอินทร์ Lukyon Phra-in, เล็บมือนาง Lepmuenang.
ศ: ศาลายา Salaya.
ส: สังขยา Sangkhaya, สามปี Sampi, สามฤดู Samruedu, สายทิพย์ Saithip, สายน้ำค้าง Sainamkang, สายฝน Saifon, สาวน้อยกระทืบหอ Saonoi Kratuepho, สำปั่น Sampan, สีส้ม Sisom, แสงทอง Saengthong.
ห: หงษ์ทอง Hongthong, หงษ์สา Hongsa, หงสาวดี Hongsawadi, หนองแซง Nongsaeng, หนังกลางวัน Nangklangwan, หมอนทอง Monthong, หวานน้ำผึ้ง Wannampueng, หอยแครง Hoikrang, หอระฆัง Horakang, หินทอง Hinthong, แห้ว Haeo, แห้วหลวงอิงค์ Haeo Luanging.
อ: อกร่อง Okrong, อกร่องกะทิ Okrong Kati, อกร่องขาว Okrong Khao, อกร่องเขียว Okrong Khiao, อกร่องทอง Okrong Thong, อกร่องทองดำกลายพันธุ์ Okrong Thongdamklaiphan, อกร่องไทรโยก Okrong Saiyok, อกร่องพิกุลทอง Okrong Phikunthong, อกร่องภรณ์ทิพย์ Okrong Phonthip, อกร่องมัน Okrong Man, อกร่องหอมทอง Okrong Homthong, อ่อนมัน Onman, อินทรชิต Inthorachit, ไอ้ฮวบ Ai-Huap
Vietnam: Cao Lãnh Cát Chu mango, Bình Định Elephant mango, Hoà Lộc Sand mango

Oceania
Australia: B74 (known by the brand name Calypso), Brooks, Green eating, Haden, Irwin, Keitt, Kensington Pride, Kent, Nam Doc Mai, Palmer, R2E2, Honey Gold.
Hawaii: Hawaiian Common, Gouveia, Hawaiian Dwarf, Kurahige, Mapulehu, Momi K, Pope, Rapoza, Sugai, Turpentine

Africa
Cameroon: Améliorée du Cameroun
Egypt: Alphonso, Hindi, Hindi Besennara, Beid El Agl, Oweisi, Fuss Oweis, Taymoor, Zebdiah, Mesk
Kenya: Apple Mango, Batwi, Boubo, Ngowe

Mali: Amelie, Kent
Réunion island: Carotte, Jose, Lucie, Auguste
South Africa: Fascell, Haden, Keitt, Kent, Sensation, Tommy Atkins, Zill
Sudan: Alfonso, Bez el-Anza, Oweisi, Taymoor
Tanzania: Boribo Muyini, Dodo, Mawazo, Sindano
Zambia: Heidi, Kent, Sensation, Tommy

Americas
Brazil: Coquinho, Haden, Espada, Espada de Ouro, Keitt, Kent, Rosa, Palmer, Tommy Atkins
Costa Rica: Haden, Irwin, Keitt, Mora, Tommy Atkins
Cuba: San Felipe, Prieto, Toledo
Ecuador: Ambassador, Alphonso, Ataulfo, Criollos, Haden, Julie, Keitt, Kent, Reina, Tommy Atkins
Guatemala: Haden, Kent, Tommy Atkins
.Haiti: Francine (Madame Francis), Muscas, Labiche, Baptiste, Rosalie, Poirier, Corne, Fil
Honduras: Haden, Kent, Lancetilla, Tommy Atkins
Mexico: Ataulfo, Haden, Irwin, Kent, Manila, Palmer, Sensation, Tommy Atkins, Van Dyke, Petakon, Oro, Criollo, Niño, Miyako.
Peru: Criollos, Haden, Keitt, Kent, Tommy Atkins
Suriname: Rood borsje, Tetéé
United States (California): Keitt, Haden, Timotayo, Manila
 US (Florida): Alampur Baneshan, Alice, Alphonso, Anderson, Angie, Bailey's Marvel, Bennet Alphonso, Beverly, Bombay, Brahm Kai Meu, Brooks, Carabao, Carrie, Chok Anan, Cogshall, Cushman, Dot, Duncan, Earlygold, East Indian, Edward, Eldon, Emerald, Fairchild, Fascell, Florigon, Ford, Gary, Gaylour, Glenn, Gold Nugget, Golden Lippens, Graham, Haden, Hatcher, Ice Cream, Irwin, Ivory, Jakarta, Jean Ellen, Julie, Keitt, Kensington Pride, Kent, Lancetilla, Langra Benarsi, Lippens, Mallika, Manilita, Mendoza, Mulgoba, Nam Doc Mai, Nam Tam Teen, Neelum, Nu Wun Chan, Okrung, Osteen, Palmer, Parvin, Pascual, Philippine, Pickering, Po Pyu Kalay, Rosigold, Ruby, Rutledge, Saigon, Sensation, Sophie Fry, Southern Blush, Spirit of '76, Springfels, Sunset, Suwon Tip, Tebow, Toledo, Tom Dang, Tommy Atkins, Torbert, Turpentine, Valencia Pride, Van Dyke, Zill
Venezuela: Haden, Keitt, Kent, Tommy Atkins
West Indies: Amélie, Black (blackie), Bombay, Dou-douce, East Indian, Graham, Haden, Julie (St. Julian), Long, Madame Francis, Rose, Spice-Box, Starch

Europe
Malta: Keitt, Maya, Kensington Pride, Glenn, Irwin
Italy: Kensington Pride, Glenn, Tommy Atkins, Keitt, Maya, Van Dyke, Osteen, Kent

Middle East
Israel: Haden, Omer, Orly, Shelley, Keitt, Kent, Maya, Nimrod, Palmer, Tommy Atkins, BD-4-98, Zrifin, Palmer, Naomi,King David.
Yemen: Taimoor, Abu Sanarah, Hafoos, Al Fawnas, Al Bameli, Al Burkani, Sudanese, Abu Samakah

See also 
 International Code of Nomenclature for Cultivated Plants
 Photos of different mango cultivars from wikimedia

References

External links 

Mango cultivars

Lists of foods
Lists of cultivars
 
Flora of India (region)